Robert Gray (February 10, 1945 – October 31, 2013) was an American actor.

Biography
He began his career with minor roles in TV-series such as The Incredible Hulk and The Dukes of Hazzard. In the John Carpenter-directed miniseries Elvis (1979), he played Elvis Presley's best friend Red West. He also had a recurring role as "Cliff Willoughby" in the TV-series Harper Valley PTA. He had supporting roles in a few obscure movies like UFOria (1985) and Omega Syndrome (1986). His movie-credits also include minor roles in The Adventures of Buckaroo Banzai Across the 8th Dimension (1984), Hamburger: The Motion Picture (1986), Armed and Dangerous (1986), and Innerspace (1987), which also marked his final acting credit.

Filmography

External links
 

1945 births
2013 deaths
American male film actors
American male television actors
Male actors from Tulsa, Oklahoma